Amphitecna spathicalyx is a species of plant in the family Bignoniaceae. It is endemic to Panama.

References

Flora of Panama
spathicalyx
Critically endangered plants
Taxonomy articles created by Polbot